NonStop! The Album is the debut album by German musical group Fun Factory.

The original lead singer, Balca, appears only in one music video titled "Groove Me". Due to a disagreement, she separated from the group but because she was under a contract, she still had to continue singing for the band. She was replaced in visuals by Marie-Anett Mey.

Track listing

 "Intro Jam" — 1:15
 "Groove Me" — 4:16
 "Take Your Chance" — 4:32
 "Love of My Life" — 5:03
 "Close to You" — 4:39
 "We are the World" — 4:19
 "Fun Factory's Groove" — 3:35
 "Hey Little Girl" — 6:46
 "Fun Factory's Theme" — 3:05
 "Prove Your Love / Freestylin'" — 5:36
 "Pain" — 5:45
 "I Miss Her" — 6:05
 "Close to You (Close To Ragga Remix)" (bonus) — 4:36
 "Take Your Chance (Take The Tribe Mix)" (bonus) — 5:53

Charts
Singles

Sources
 Fun Factory.euweb.cz
 NonStop! The Album at Discogs
 NonStop! The Album at Allmusic

References

1994 albums
Fun Factory (band) albums